Richard John Carr (21 January 1911 – 25 April 2000) was an Indian field hockey player who competed in the 1932 Summer Olympics.

In 1932 he was a member of the Indian field hockey team, which won the gold medal. He played one match as forward and scored one goal. He also competed in the men's 4 × 100 metres relay in the athletics programme. He was born in Jha-Jha, India and was a student of the prestigious school Oak Grove School, Mussoorie, India.

References

External links
 
 Richard Carr's profile at databaseOlympics

1911 births
2000 deaths
Field hockey players from Bihar
Olympic field hockey players of India
Athletes (track and field) at the 1932 Summer Olympics
Field hockey players at the 1932 Summer Olympics
Indian male field hockey players
Olympic gold medalists for India
Anglo-Indian people
Olympic medalists in field hockey
Medalists at the 1932 Summer Olympics
Indian male sprinters
Olympic athletes of India
Indian emigrants to Australia
Australian people of Anglo-Indian descent